Joan Sabaté Borràs (born 26 March 1993) is a Spanish footballer who plays for CF Amposta as a midfielder.

Club career
Born in El Pinell de Brai, Tarragona, Catalonia, Sabaté was a product of Gimnàstic de Tarragona's youth categories. He made his first-team debut on 3 June 2012, starting in a 0–1 loss against Elche CF in the Segunda División, and was later assigned to the club's farm team in Tercera División.

On 11 January 2014, Sabaté was loaned to UD Torredembarra. He returned to Pobla in June, being subsequently released, and joined CF Reddis shortly after.

References

External links
 Gimnàstic profile 
 
 

1993 births
Living people
People from Terra Alta (comarca)
Sportspeople from the Province of Tarragona
Spanish footballers
Footballers from Catalonia
Association football midfielders
Segunda División players
Tercera División players
Gimnàstic de Tarragona footballers
CF Pobla de Mafumet footballers